Agioi Anargyroi is a suburb in the north-central part of the Athens agglomeration, Greece. It takes its name from the "Holy Unmercenaries": saints who received no payment for their medical services. Since the 2011 local government reform it is part of the municipality Agioi Anargyroi-Kamatero, of which it is the seat and a municipal unit.

Geography

The municipal unit has an area of 3.200 km2. Its built-up area is continuous with that of municipality of Athens and the neighbouring suburbs Peristeri, Ilion, Kamatero, Acharnes, Nea Filadelfeia and Nea Chalkidona. Motorway 1 (Athens–Thessaloniki) passes east of the town. Agioi Anargyroi has a station on the Athens–Thessaloniki railway. The old metric Piraeus–Patras railway passes through the town as well.

Historical population

International relations

Agioi Anargyroi is twinned with:

 Opole, Poland

References
Notes

External links
Municipality of Agioi Anargyroi 
Information on Agioi Anargyroi 

Populated places in West Athens (regional unit)